Wendy and Bonnie Flower were American singing sisters, who recorded the album Genesis in 1969 for Skye Records. The album was produced and arranged by jazz polymath Gary McFarland. McFarland at the time was a partner in the ownership of Skye, along with music impresario Norman Schwartz, Latin percussionist Cal Tjader (who was Wendy and Bonnie's godfather), and guitarist Gábor Szabó.

The sisters grew up in Millbrae, California, in the San Francisco Bay suburbs. Their parents, Art and Jeane Flower, were professional musicians. In 1967, Wendy played and recorded with an early San Francisco psychedelic band called Crystal Fountain; Bonnie later joined the band as drummer.  The following year, Tjader heard some of the Flower sisters' acoustic home demos and arranged a recording session with Skye. The sisters, who were teens at the time the album was recorded, composed all the songs. McFarland served as arranger on the sessions, crafting a post-psychedelic soft rock sound with Brazilian overtones. Musicians who performed on the album included guitarist Larry Carlton, drummer Jim Keltner, and keyboardist Mike Melvoin.

The Skye label went bankrupt shortly after the album's release. In 1971, while planning for additional recording with the Flower sisters, McFarland died of methadone poisoning in mysterious circumstances in a New York bar.

In the early 1970s, Wendy and Bonnie provided background vocals on two Cal Tjader albums for Fantasy Records. Thereafter, the sisters pursued separate careers in music and entertainment, but did not record together again.

Genesis was reissued on CD in 2001 by the Sundazed Records label. In 2008, it was reissued in expanded format, including demos, alternate mixes, and vintage live recordings, on 2-CD and 3-LP vinyl sets.

Their recording "By the Sea" was sampled by the Welsh space rock band Super Furry Animals on a single "Hello Sunshine," which is also the opening track on the band's 2003 album Phantom Power. In 2010, French singer Laetitia Sadier of UK group Stereolab recorded "By the Sea" for release on her album The Trip.

After singing guest harmony with Super Furry Animals at San Francisco's The Fillmore, New York's The Tonic and London's ICA, Wendy Flower performed (backed by Jane Weaver and The High Llamas) as one of the Lost Ladies of Folk at the 2007, Jarvis Cocker-curated Meltdown Festival. She sang on Weaver's Fallen By Watchbird album and, in 2013, released her own indie-pop album, New. 

Bonnie Flower died at the age of 63 on November 15, 2017.

References

External links
Wendy Flower personal website
Skye Records discography
Wendy and Bonnie CD at Sundazed Records

American musical duos
Musical groups from San Francisco
Psychedelic rock music groups from California
Sibling duos
Skye Records artists